Saint-Léger-en-Yvelines is a commune in the Yvelines department in the Île-de-France region in north-central France.

Geography

The commune of Saint-Léger-en-Yvelines is in the centre of the department and in the heart of the Forest of Rambouillet.

The commune is a rural one, and 94% of the unbuilt area is covered by forest, complemented by some cultivated clearings, primarily to the south of the village.

See also
Communes of the Yvelines department

References

Communes of Yvelines